Saw Sala was a principal queen consort of King Uzana II of Pinya.

Ancestry
The queen was descended from the Pagan and Myinsaing royal lines.

References

Bibliography
 

Queens consort of Pinya
14th-century Burmese women